Marceli Handelsman (1882–1945) was a Polish historian, a Warsaw University professor, medievalist, modern historian, and historical methodologist.

Life
Marceli Handelsman was born on 8 July 1882, in Warsaw, to a family of distant Jewish ancestry. After graduating in law from the Russian-language Imperial Warsaw University, he moved to Berlin, where he began studies in the history department of Unter den Linden University. In 1906, however, he was dismissed from the school because of his involvement in socialist organizations. Afterwards Handelsman continued his studies at various European universities including Paris, Zürich (where he received his doctorate in 1908), Rapperswil, Vienna and finally London.

During World War I, in 1915, he returned to Warsaw and joined Warsaw University as a professor of modern history. He was also appointed a member of the Polish Academy of Learning. One of the most prominent historians of the age, between 1918 and 1939 he was also the editor-in-chief of the Historical Review and the head of a Commission for the Atlas of History of Polish Lands (1920–35).  He was also a member of the Academy of Moral and Political Sciences in Paris and the London-based Royal Society.

Initially a medievalist, in the Interbellum Handelsman devoted much study to 19th-century Polish political history, including the works of Prince Adam Jerzy Czartoryski and the Hôtel Lambert circle.

After the outbreak of World War II Marceli Handelsman hid from the Germans because of his Jewish roots. Nevertheless, he took an active part in underground education in Poland during World War II and served as a professor in the underground Warsaw University. After 1942, under the noms de guerre "Maciej Romański" and "Maciej Targowski," he worked with the Bureau of Information and Propaganda of the Headquarters of the Home Army.

Arrested by the Gestapo in 1944, he was sent to Gross-Rosen concentration camp. Subsequently transferred to Mittelbau-Dora concentration camp, he was murdered on 20 March 1945.

Students
Among his students were many figures such as Stanisław Arnold, Artur Eisenbach, Aleksander Gieysztor, Stefan Kieniewicz, Tadeusz Manteuffel, Emanuel Ringelblum, and Mieczysław Żywczyński.

See also
List of Poles

Notes

References
"Handelsman, Marceli," Encyklopedia Polski, p. 213.
 

1882 births
1945 deaths
Polish Jews who died in the Holocaust
20th-century Polish historians
Polish male non-fiction writers
People who died in Mittelbau-Dora concentration camp
Polish civilians killed in World War II
Polish people of the Polish–Soviet War
Writers from Warsaw
Polish people executed in Nazi concentration camps
Executed people from Masovian Voivodeship
Jewish Polish writers
University of Warsaw alumni
Polish medievalists
Academic staff of the University of Warsaw
Recipients of the Order of Polonia Restituta
Recipients of the Order of Merit of the Republic of Hungary
Officiers of the Légion d'honneur
Commandeurs of the Légion d'honneur
Burials at Powązki Cemetery